Percy Holden Illingworth (19 March 1869 – 3 January 1915) was a British Liberal politician. He served as Parliamentary Secretary to the Treasury under H. H. Asquith between 1912 and 1915.

Background and education
Illingworth was the third and youngest son of Henry Illingworth, of Bradford, a member of an old Yorkshire family, and his wife Mary, daughter of Sir Isaac Holden, 1st Baronet. Albert Illingworth, 1st Baron Illingworth, was his elder brother. He was educated at Jesus College, Cambridge, where he played rugby for the university, winning two sporting 'Blues' in The Varsity Matches of 1889 and 1890. He was called to the Bar, Inner Temple, in 1894. He later served in the Second Boer War.

Political career
In 1906 Illingworth was returned to Parliament for Shipley, and served as Parliamentary Private Secretary to the Chief Secretary for Ireland (James Bryce and Augustine Birrell respectively) from 1906 to 1910. From February 1910 to April 1912, he was a Junior Lord of the Treasury under H. H. Asquith. In 1912 Asquith appointed him Parliamentary Secretary to the Treasury, a post he held until his sudden death in early 1915. He had been nominated to the Privy Council but died before he could be sworn in.

Family
Illingworth married Mary Mackenzie Coats (b. 1883), daughter of George Coats, of Staneley, Renfrewshire, on 16 January 1907, at Paisley. They had three sons. He died suddenly in January 1915 of typhoid fever.

References

External links 
 

1869 births
1915 deaths
Liberal Party (UK) MPs for English constituencies
UK MPs 1906–1910
UK MPs 1910
UK MPs 1910–1918
Alumni of Jesus College, Cambridge
English rugby union players
Cambridge University R.U.F.C. players
Percy
Rugby union players from Yorkshire